The Billion Dollar Bubble is a 1978 American film made for the BBC series Horizon and directed by Brian Gibson about the story of the two-billion-dollar insurance embezzlement scheme involving Equity Funding Corporation of America.  The movie stars James Woods in the role of the actuary.

Plot
Temporarily unable to obtain current figures for their upcoming business report, Art Lewis and others in the insurance department of Equity Funding devise a plan to forge figures totaling the company's expected performance for that year. When the company does not perform as well as expected Art and others decide to create fake insurance policies in order to generate the necessary figures to match the expected performance, a provisional measure that is only expected to last a short time. More policies must continually be created in order to continue to the supposed growth of the company so Art enlists the aid of technician Al Green to develop computer software to randomly generate policies, the details of which must then be filled out manually. Computer and human error lead to supposed policyholders filing claims for medical conditions of the opposite sex and bills being returned because the addressees are unknown. The company manages to deceive individual auditors and the management offers Art more stock in the company and higher pay as enticement to continue the charade, knowing that he has been looking to move up in the company. Eventually the state insurance commissioners intervene and many of the key players are sent to prison.

Cast
 James Woods as Art Lewis (sentenced to a minimum of 2 years in prison)
 William Hootkins as Lloyd Edens (sentenced to a minimum of 2 years in prison)
 Shane Rimmer as Fred Levin (sentenced to 5 years in prison)
 Sam Wanamaker as Stanley Goldblum (sentenced to 8 years in prison)
 Christopher Guest as Al Green (sentenced to 3 months in prison)
 Lionel Murton as Joe Taubkin (received a suspended sentence)

See also
 Fictional actuaries

References

External links

  Billion Dollar Bubble at Rotten Tomatoes

American drama films
1978 drama films
1978 films
Films set in 1969
Films set in 1970
Films set in 1971
Films set in 1972
Films set in 1973
Films set in Los Angeles
Films directed by Brian Gibson
1970s English-language films
1970s American films
1978 television films